Self-Help is a national community development financial institution headquartered in Durham, North Carolina. Between the years of 1980-2017, Self-Help reportedly provided over $7 billion in financing to 146,000 families, individuals and businesses. It aims to drive economic development and strengthen communities by providing financial services, lending to individuals, small businesses and nonprofits. It also aims to develop real estate and promote fair financial practices across the nation. Through its credit union network, Self-Help serves 150,000 members in North Carolina, California, Illinois, South Carolina, Virginia, Wisconsin and Florida.

In recent years, Self-Help's credit union network has expanded. In North Carolina, Self-Help Credit Union has merged with more than 10 community-focused credit unions—locally rooted institutions that sought to stabilize their operations and increase output. More recently, Self-Help has had mergers with community credit unions in Florida and South Carolina.

In 2008, Self-Help started serving in California as self-help federal credit union (SHFCU). In Los Angeles, Self-Help acquired five stores from a conventional check casher and converted them into a hybrid check casher/credit union model that serves unbanked and underbanked consumers.

Today, Self-Help Credit Union and Self-Help Federal Credit Union form a network of over 50 branches serving approximately 145,000 people in six states.

Aims 
Martin Eakes and Bonnie Wright founded Self-Help in 1980 to provide management assistance to worker-cooperative businesses in low-income communities. In 1984, Self-Help established its financing affiliates, Self-Help Credit Union and Self-Help Ventures Fund, to help disadvantaged individuals build wealth through home and small business ownership.

Supporting small businesses 

Self-Help's early lending focused on small businesses. The organization adapted international microlending models to the U.S. market, and then expanded into larger loans well-suited to bigger firms that were a main source of employment in rural communities. Over the years, Self-Help diversified its lending to businesses and nonprofits. Through 2014, Self-Help had made over $800 million in loans to entrepreneurs.

Supporting homeownership 

In 1985, Self-Help began making home loans to North Carolina families unable to secure conventional mortgages. Looking to expand its community development impact, Self-Help worked with Fannie Mae to create more home-buying opportunities for underserved borrowers in the late 1980s. Later, Self-Help partnered with Fannie Mae and the Ford Foundation in 1998 to create the Community Advantage Program which provides credit enhancement to conventional lenders. The Community Advantage Program reportedly awarded over $2 billion in affordable home mortgage loans to minority and low-wealth homebuyers nationwide over a five-year period. After analyzing the data from this program, Self-Help determined that low-income borrowers are good credit risks when they are offered responsible loans at fair rates.

Developing communities 

Self-Help's first real estate development project took place in Durham, NC, where it converted a downtown office building into affordable space for local nonprofits and small businesses. Recently, Self-Help has invested $144 million in commercial real estate projects to invigorate downtown areas and neighborhoods and created affordable housing for 228 families.

Fighting predatory lending 

In the late 1990s, homeowners began coming to Self-Help Credit Union seeking help to avoid foreclosure after unscrupulous subprime lenders had siphoned off their home equity. In response to predatory loans, Self-Help worked with a state coalition in 1999 to help pass the North Carolina Predatory Lending Law, the first such law in the country. In 2002, Self-Help established the Center for Responsible Lending (CRL) to build on initial successes and expand our focus nationally, and to tackle practices such as payday lending in addition to mortgage lending. Since 2002, CRL has worked with community advocates, policymakers and industry groups to fight against outrageous lending abuses that strip billions of dollars from American families.

Awards
Over the years Self-Help has received numerous awards for its work from organizations such as Preservation North Carolina, the North Carolina Department of Commerce, and the Triangle Commercial Real Estate Women.

In 2007, Self-Help was named one of the twelve high-impact nonprofits in the book Forces For Good along with other organizations such as America's Second Harvest, Habitat for Humanity, The Heritage Foundation, and Teach for America.

In June 2009, Self-Help won the Dora Maxwell Social Responsibility Award, which "recognizes and promotes credit unions’ social responsibility efforts within the communities they serve."

In 2009, AARP awarded Self-Help co-founder and CEO Martin Eakes an Inspire Award, which "pays tribute to ten extraordinary people age 50 and over who have made the world a better place through their innovative thinking, passion, and perseverance." Other 2009 winners included Glenn Close, Quincy Jones, and Alma Powell.

In 2011, The Ford Foundation named co-founder and CEO Martin Eakes named one of twelve Social Change Visionaries honored by in recognition of the foundation's 75th birthday. All twelve social innovators were awarded $100,000. Ford's release stated that “Martin Eakes is a national leader in the fight against abusive financial practices that target poor people and trap them in cycles of poverty.

Notes

External links
Self Help
Center for Responsible Lending

Organizations based in North Carolina
Microfinance organizations
Credit unions based in North Carolina